Baldacchino is a surname. Notable people with the surname include:

Clifford Gatt Baldacchino (born 1988), Maltese footballer
Francis Baldacchino (1937–2009), Kenyan Roman Catholic bishop
Godfrey Baldacchino (born 1960), Maltese-Canadian social scientist
Joseph Baldacchino (1894–1974), Maltese archaeologist
Peter Baldacchino (born 1960), Maltese-born American Roman Catholic bishop
Romilda Baldacchino Zarb, Maltese politician
Ruth Baldacchino, (born 1979), LGBT rights activist
Ryan Baldacchino (born 1981), English footballer

Maltese-language surnames